Aquincola amnicola is a Gram-negative, aerobic, short rod-shaped and motile bacterium from the genus of Aquincola which has been isolated from water from the Caohu River in Taiwan.

References

Betaproteobacteria
Bacteria described in 2018